Hamma Hamma Balds is a Washington state Natural Area Preserve.  It is located in the eastern foothills of the Olympic Mountains in Mason County, above the Hamma Hamma River and adjacent to Olympic National Forest. The term "balds" refers to rocky outcroppings in the heavy forest. The preserve totals .

The preserve was created in the 2008 fiscal year through intra-agency land exchanges between various trusts.

See also
Appalachian balds

References

External links
Hamma Hamma Balds Natural Area Preserve Washington Department of Natural Resources

Protected areas of Mason County, Washington
Washington Natural Areas Program